Flirtation Peak is a summit in Clear Creek County, Colorado, in the United States.

The peak lies south of Idaho Springs.

References

Mountains of Clear Creek County, Colorado
Mountains of Colorado